Hans Dieter Pötsch (born 28 March 1951) is an Austrian businessman, the chairman of the executive board of Porsche SE, and chairman of the supervisory board of Volkswagen since 2015, when he succeeded Ferdinand Piëch.

Life and career
Pötsch was born on 28 March 1951, in Traun near Linz, Austria. Pötsch studied engineering management at Technische Hochschule Darmstadt.

In 2003, Pötsch became a director of Volkswagen AG.

Following the resignation of Ferdinand Piëch, Pötsch became chairman of the board at Volkswagen. His nomination came at the behest of the Porsche and Piëch families, who together control a majority of VW's voting shares via the Porsche holding company.

In 2016, a German market manipulation probe into the Volkswagen emissions scandal expanded to include Pötsch.

Other activities

Corporate boards
 Autostadt, chairman of the supervisory board
 Bertelsmann, member of the supervisory board (since 2011)
 VfL Wolfsburg, member of the supervisory board (since 2009)
 Deutsche Bank, member of the advisory board
 Landesbank Baden-Württemberg (LBBW), member of the advisory board

Non-profit organizations
 Kunstmuseum Wolfsburg, member of the board of trustees

References

1951 births
Austrian businesspeople
Living people

Technische Universität Darmstadt alumni